Robert D. Hough is an American born mathematician specializing in number theory, probability and discrete mathematics.  He is an associate professor of mathematics at Stony Brook University.

Early life and education 
Hough holds BS in Math, MS in CS and PhD in Math degrees from Stanford University. He completed his PhD under Kannan Soundararajan in 2012.  Hough was a post-doctoral researcher at Cambridge University and Oxford University in the United Kingdom working with Ben Green from 2013 to 2015, and was a post-doctoral member of the Institute for Advanced Study, Princeton, New Jersey from 2015 to 2016.

Achievements

Hough won the Mathematical Association of America's David P. Robbins Prize at the Joint Math Meetings in 2017. The prize was given for finding the solution of a problem imposed by Paul Erdős.

In February 2020, Hough won the Sloan Research Fellowship. He has also won a Trustees Faculty Award from Stony Brook University.

Career 
Since 2016 Hough has been on the faculty of Stony Brook University.

References 

Year of birth missing (living people)
Place of birth missing (living people)
Living people
American mathematicians
American academics
21st-century mathematicians
Stony Brook University faculty
Stanford University alumni
Sloan Research Fellows
Cambridge mathematicians
Alumni of the University of Cambridge